Derbyshire County Cricket Club in 1950 was the cricket season when the English club Derbyshire had been playing for seventy-nine years. It was their forty-sixth  season in the County Championship and they  won eight matches in the County Championship to finish in fifth place.

1950 season

Derbyshire played 28 matches in the County Championship, one against Oxford University and one against the touring West Indies.  Pat Vaulkhard was captain. Alan Revill scored most runs, and Albert Rhodes took most wickets with 125.

Guy Willatt joined Derbyshire as designated  captain but was hampered by injury and did not fill the role until the following season.  Derek Morgan  who also joined was another future captain and played until 1969. A third key played making his debut was Arnold Hamer who scored over 15,000 runs over ten years. John Kelly  joined Derbyshire from Lancashire and played for ten years and Alwyn Eato a former footballer played for five years. Bertram Richardson  played for four years, and Mike Stevenson who was at Cambridge University played occasional games in two seasons.

Matches

{| class="wikitable" width="100%"
! bgcolor="#efefef" colspan=6 | List of  matches
|- bgcolor="#efefef"
!No.
!Date
!V
!Result 
!Margin
!Notes
 |- 
|1
| 10 May 1950
|  SurreyKennington Oval 
|bgcolor="#FF0000"|Lost 
| 4 wickets
|    HL Jackson 5-41; Laker 5-57 
|- 
|2
|13 May 1950
| Northamptonshire   County Ground, Derby 
|bgcolor="#00FF00"|Won 
| 6 wickets
|    AC Revill 108 
|- 
|3
| 20 May 1950
 | SomersetQueen's Park, Chesterfield 
 |bgcolor="#FFCC00"|Drawn
| 
|    Hazell 6-76; AEG Rhodes  5-14 
|- 
|4
|  24 May 1950
| Middlesex   Lord's Cricket Ground, St John's Wood 
 |bgcolor="#FFCC00"|Drawn
| 
|     
|- 
|5
|  27 May 1950
| Warwickshire  County Ground, Derby 
 |bgcolor="#FFCC00"|Drawn
| 
|    Dollery 163; Pritchard 6-78 
|- 
|6
|  31 May 1950 
| LeicestershireGrace Road, Leicester 
|bgcolor="#FF0000"|Lost 
| 4 wickets
|    Tompkin 130; AC Revill 119; Lester 6-87 
|- 
|7
|  03 Jun 1950 
| Yorkshire   Park Avenue Cricket Ground, Bradford 
|bgcolor="#00FF00"|Won 
| 79 runs
|    D Smith 122; Len Hutton 107; AEG Rhodes  6-74 
|- 
| 8
|  07 Jun 1950 
|  WorcestershireRutland Recreation Ground, Ilkeston 
|bgcolor="#00FF00"|Won 
| 65 runs
|    HL Jackson 6-57 
|- 
|9
| 10 Jun 1950 
|  Oxford University   The University Parks, Oxford 
 |bgcolor="#FFCC00"|Drawn
| 
|   PDS Blake 101; AEG Rhodes  7-68 
|- 
|10
| 14 Jun 1950 
| Glamorgan  The Gnoll, Neath
|bgcolor="#FF0000"|Lost 
| 92 runs
|    HL Jackson 5-38 and 6-63; Trick 5-18 
|- 
|11
|  17 Jun 1950
 |  Gloucestershire   Ashley Down Ground, Bristol 
|bgcolor="#FF0000"|Lost 
| 81 runs
|    Young 117; HL Jackson 6-37; Cook 6-82; Goddard 7-42 
|- 
| 12
|  21 Jun 1950 
| Glamorgan  County Ground, Derby 
 |bgcolor="#FFCC00"|Drawn
| 
|     
|- 
|  13
| 24 Jun 1950
| Lancashire   Park Road Ground, Buxton
 |bgcolor="#FFCC00"|Drawn
| 
|    Ikin 103; Tattershall 6-46; 
|- 
| 14
| 28 Jun 1950 
| Yorkshire  Queen's Park, Chesterfield
|bgcolor="#FF0000"|Lost 
| 7 wickets
|    Halliday 144; AEG Rhodes  5-82 
|- 
|15
|  01 Jul 1950 
| Nottinghamshire    Rutland Recreation Ground, Ilkeston
|bgcolor="#FF0000"|Lost 
| 1 wicket
|    CS Elliott  158; Jepson 5-68 
|- 
|16
|  05 Jul 1950 
|  WorcestershireCounty Ground, New Road, Worcester 
|bgcolor="#FF0000"|Lost 
| 4 wickets
|    Jenkins 7-31; P Jackson 7-107 
|- 
|17
|  08 Jul 1950
| Lancashire   Old Trafford, Manchester
|bgcolor="#00FF00"|Won 
| 83 runs
|    AC Revill 109; AEG Rhodes  5-79; Tattershall 5-72 
|- 
| 18
| 12 Jul 1950
| Hampshire  County Ground, Derby 
 |bgcolor="#FFCC00"|Drawn
| 
|    TA Hall 5-60 
|- 
| 19
| 15 Jul 1950
| West Indies  Queen's Park, Chesterfield
 |bgcolor="#FFCC00"|Drawn
| 
|    C Gladwin  6-40 
|- 
| 20
| 22 Jul 1950
| Essex   Queen's Park, Chesterfield
|bgcolor="#00FF00"|Won 
| 6 wickets
|    Bailey 5-54 
|- 
| 21
| 26 Jul 1950
|  Sussex     Ind Coope Ground, Burton-on-Trent
 |bgcolor="#FFCC00"|Drawn
| 
|    Langridge 184; HL Jackson 5-27 
|- 
| 22
|  29 Jul 1950
| Hampshire  County Ground, Southampton
|bgcolor="#FF0000"|Lost 
| 49 runs
|    Knott 5-83 and 7-93; C Gladwin  5-51 
|- 
|23
|  05 Aug 1950
| Warwickshire Edgbaston, Birmingham 
|bgcolor="#00FF00"|Won 
| 8 wickets
|    Grove 6-60; HL Jackson 5-22 and 5-76 
|- 
|24
| 09 Aug 1950
 |  Gloucestershire   County Ground, Derby 
 |bgcolor="#FFCC00"|Drawn
| 
|    DM Young 149 
|- 
| 25
|  12 Aug 1950 
| Nottinghamshire    Trent Bridge, Nottingham 
 |bgcolor="#FFCC00"|Drawn
| 
|    AEG Rhodes  6-69; Butler 5-38 
|- 
|26
|  16 Aug 1950 
| LeicestershireQueen's Park, Chesterfield 
 |bgcolor="#FFCC00"|Drawn
| 
|    Berry 118 
|- 
| 27
|  19 Aug 1950
| Kent County Ground, Derby 
|bgcolor="#00FF00"|Won 
| Innings and 98 runs
|    C Gladwin  6-56 
|- 
| 28
|  23 Aug 1950
| Kent Crabble Athletic Ground, Dover 
|bgcolor="#FF0000"|Lost 
| 9 wickets
|    C Gladwin  7-73; Wright 6-45 
|- 
| 29
|  26 Aug 1950
| Essex   Southchurch Park, Southend-on-Sea 
|bgcolor="#00FF00"|Won 
| 10 wickets
|    JM Kelly 130; Gladwin 7-80 
|- 
|30
|  30 Aug 1950
|  Sussex     County Ground, Hove 
 |bgcolor="#FFCC00"|Drawn
| 
|     
|-

Statistics

County Championship batting averages

County Championship bowling averages

Wicket Keeping
GO Dawkes 	First Class Catches 49, Stumping 10 
D Smith First Class Catches 20, Stumping 1

See also
Derbyshire County Cricket Club seasons
1950 English cricket season

References

1950 in English cricket
Derbyshire County Cricket Club seasons